Néstor E. Carballo (3 February 1929 - 22 September 1981) is a Uruguayan football defender who played for Uruguay in the 1954 FIFA World Cup. He also played for Club Nacional de Football.

References

External links
 FIFA profile

1929 births
1981 deaths
Uruguayan footballers
Uruguay international footballers
Association football defenders
Uruguayan Primera División players
Club Nacional de Football players
1954 FIFA World Cup players